Melanie Seeger (born 8 January 1977 in Brandenburg an der Havel) is a German race walker. She has represented Germany at the Summer Olympics on three occasions (2004, 2008 and 2012). She has also competed at the IAAF World Championships in Athletics on four occasions and walked at four consecutive editions of the European Athletics Championships.

She holds the German record for the indoor 3000 m walk.

She took time away from athletics in 2009 to give birth to her first child, Helena. She returned to competition in 2010 and she had the best championship performance of her career at the 2010 European Athletics Championships, finishing fourth in the 20 kilometres race walk behind a Russian sweep of medalists.

Achievements

References

External links 
 
 

1977 births
Living people
German female racewalkers
German national athletics champions
Athletes (track and field) at the 2004 Summer Olympics
Athletes (track and field) at the 2008 Summer Olympics
Athletes (track and field) at the 2012 Summer Olympics
Olympic athletes of Germany
Sportspeople from Brandenburg an der Havel